One Avighna Park is a twin 64-storey luxury residential skyscraper, located in Parel, Mumbai, Maharashtra, India.

Location 
One Avighna Park is located in the locality of Parel in Mumbai.

See also
List of tallest buildings in Mumbai
List of tallest buildings in India
List of tallest buildings and structures in the Indian subcontinent
List of tallest residential buildings

References

External links
Emporis | One Avighna Park Residential Tower|65 floors

Buildings and structures under construction in India
Residential skyscrapers in Mumbai